Aslaug Dahl (born March 23, 1949) is a Norwegian former cross-country skier who competed during the early 1970s. She won a bronze medal in the 3 × 5 km relay at the 1972 Winter Olympics in Sapporo.

Cross-country skiing results

Olympic Games

World Championships

External links
Database Olympics profile

1949 births
Cross-country skiers at the 1972 Winter Olympics
Norwegian female cross-country skiers
Olympic cross-country skiers of Norway
Olympic bronze medalists for Norway
Living people
Olympic medalists in cross-country skiing
Medalists at the 1972 Winter Olympics